Saklıkent is a winter resort in Turkey, 45 kilometres from Antalya and 60 kilometres from Antalya Airport. It is open for skiing from November to May. Because of its proximity to Antalya, one can ski and then one hour later swim in the Mediterranean Sea.

Saklıkent ski resort has one two-seater chairlift, and one T-bar ski lift.

External links
Saklikent Ski Resort Official website
How to go to Saklikent Ski Center

Ski areas and resorts in Turkey
Tourist attractions in Antalya